The Star Awards for Most Popular Regional Artiste was an award presented annually at the Star Awards, a ceremony that was established in 1994.

The category was introduced in 2014. It was given in honour to the nominees were determined by a team of judges employed by MediaCorp; winners were selected by a majority vote from the public via online voting from regional countries.

Since its inception, the award was given to only 4 artistes. Jeanette Aw & Christopher Lee are the most recent and final winners in this category. Since the award was presented in 2014, Jeanette Aw remain as the only artiste to win in this category four times, surpassing Rui En, who have two wins. Jeanette Aw and Rui En have been nominated on 8 occasions, more than any other artistes. Rebecca Lim holds the record for the most nominations without a win, with seven.

The award was discontinued from 2016 onwards.

Recipients

Star Awards 2014
Most Popular Regional Award (China)  区域最受欢迎新传媒艺人 (中国)   

Most Popular Regional Award (Indonesia)  区域最受欢迎新传媒艺人 (印度尼西亚)  

Most Popular Regional Award (Malaysia)  区域最受欢迎新传媒艺人 (马来西亚)  

Most Popular Regional Award (Cambodia)  区域最受欢迎新传媒艺人 (柬埔寨)

Star Awards 2015
Most Popular Regional Award (China)  区域最受欢迎新传媒艺人 (中国)   

Most Popular Regional Award (Malaysia)  区域最受欢迎新传媒艺人 (马来西亚)  

Most Popular Regional Award (Indonesia)  区域最受欢迎新传媒艺人 (印度尼西亚)  

Most Popular Regional Award (Cambodia)  区域最受欢迎新传媒艺人 (柬埔寨)

Category Facts
Most wins

Most nominations

References 

Star Awards